PhEVER is a database of homologous gene families between viral sequences and sequences from cellular organisms.

See also
 Phylogenetics

References

External links
 https://web.archive.org/web/20101105222933/http://pbil.univ-lyon1.fr/databases/phever/

Genetics databases
Phylogenetics
Virology